Hans Philipp (17 March 1917 – 8 October 1943) was a German Luftwaffe fighter ace during World War II. A flying ace or fighter ace is a military aviator credited with shooting down five or more enemy aircraft during aerial combat. He is credited with 206 enemy aircraft shot down in over 500 combat missions. The majority of his victories were claimed over the Eastern Front, with 29 claims over the Western Front.

List of aerial victories claimed
According to US historian David T. Zabecki, Philipp was credited with 206 aerial victories. Mathews and Foreman, authors of Luftwaffe Aces — Biographies and Victory Claims, researched the German Federal Archives and found records for 193 aerial victory claims, plus nine further unconfirmed claims. This figure includes 171 claims on the Eastern Front, two during the Balkan Campaign, and 20 claims on the Western Front, including one four-engined bomber. Prien, Stemmer, Rodeike and Bock list 206 aerial victory claims plus one further unconfirmed claim. This number includes up to two further unconfirmed claims on 31 March 1942.

Victory claims were logged to a map-reference (PQ = Planquadrat), for example "PQ 00281". These sectors were then subdivided into 36 smaller units to give a location area 3 × 4 km in size.

Notes

References

Citations

Bibliography

 
 
 
 
 
 
 
 
 
 
 
 
 
 
 

Aerial victories of Philipp, Hans
Philipp, Hans
Aviation in World War II